Evans Knoll is a mainly snow-covered knoll on the coast at the north side of the terminus of Pine Island Glacier. It was mapped from air photos taken by U.S. Navy Operation Highjump, 1946–47, and was named by the Advisory Committee on Antarctic Names for Donald J. Evans, who studied very-low-frequency emissions from the upper atmosphere at Byrd Station, 1960–61.

References 

Hudson Mountains
Hills of Ellsworth Land
Volcanoes of Ellsworth Land